Pingasa pauciflavata is a moth of the family Geometridae first described by Louis Beethoven Prout in 1927. It is found on Sumatra in Indonesia.

References

Pseudoterpnini
Moths described in 1927
Taxa named by Louis Beethoven Prout